Montiglio may refer to:

 Montiglio, village in Montiglio Monferrato, Italian commune in Piedmont
 Montiglio (surname), Italian surname

See also 

 Montello (disambiguation)